Daryl Kent Jones (born April 14, 1993) is an American rapper. He is best known for his commercial debut single "Don't Mind", which reached number eight on the US Billboard Hot 100 chart. His first mixtape, Tours, was released in the summer of 2015 by Epidemic Records, We the Best Music Group and Epic Records.

Early life
Daryl Kent Jones was born on April 14, 1993, in Tallahassee, Florida. As a youngster he came in contact with music in his local church, while he was also taught to play the drums by his aunt. Later on Jones started taking formal music lessons, learning to play the piano and the Hammond organ, and studying music theory. He also started developing an interest in jazz music, appreciating the music of Quincy Jones. Jones later moved to Miami to work more with Cool & Dre.

Career
Jones first started working with record producers and songwriters Cool & Dre, signing a record deal with their label Epidemic Records. While at Epidemic he collaborated with the likes of Fat Joe, The Game, Currensy, Queen Latifah, and Busta Rhymes. Cool & Dre introduced him to DJ Khaled in 2015, who eventually signed him in a joint venture record deal to his own label We the Best Music Group and Epic Records.

Jones released his first mixtape titled Tours in July 2015. The mixtape's most successful song "Don't Mind", which contains lyrics in French, Spanish, Japanese and Haitian Creole, was later released as a single. "Don't Mind", a song which was about to be left out of the mixtape, was also remixed by Trina later on. The song debuted at number 63 on the Billboard Hot 100 chart in May 2016, reached number 46 on pop radio in the first week of May 2016, further rising to number 40 in the following weeks.

Jones was also featured in the soundtrack of NBA 2K16, participating in DJ Khaled's track "365" along with Ace Hood and Vado.

Discography

Mixtapes

Singles

As a lead artist

As featured artist

Guest appearances

Production discography

2015

The Game – The Documentary 2
06. "Dollar and a Dream"

2016

The Game – The Documentary 2 Collector's Edition
01. "Ride Solo" 
02. "Do It to You"

Awards and nominations

Underground Interviews

|-
| 2016 || Kent Jones|| Rapper of the Year || 
|-

iHeartRadio Music Awards

!Ref
|-
| 2017 || Kent Jones || Best New Hip-Hop Artist ||  ||
|-
|}

References

1993 births
Living people
African-American male rappers
Rappers from Miami
American hip hop singers
Southern hip hop musicians
21st-century American rappers
21st-century American male musicians
21st-century African-American musicians